Buinaca or Punta de la Buinaca, also spelt Boinaca, is one of the highest mountains of the Cardó Massif, Catalan Pre-Coastal Range, Catalonia, Spain. This mountain has an elevation of 764 metres above sea level.

It is the highest peak of the Serra del Boix range and it is located at the southern end of the range in an area of massive rocky outcrops known as "Les Moles". There are many wind turbines atop the smoother neighboring ridges.

See also
Cardó Massif
Catalan Pre-Coastal Range
Mountains of Catalonia

References

External links
Hiking to Buinaca and Photos 

Mountains of Catalonia